2004 ACC tournament may refer to:

 2004 ACC men's basketball tournament
 2004 ACC women's basketball tournament
 2004 ACC men's soccer tournament
 2004 ACC women's soccer tournament
 2004 Atlantic Coast Conference baseball tournament
 2004 Atlantic Coast Conference softball tournament